When the Devil Calls Your Name is a 2019 South Korean television series starring Jung Kyung-ho, Park Sung-woong, Lee Seol and Lee El. It is inspired by Johann Wolfgang von Goethe's work Faust. It aired on tvN from July 31 to September 19, 2019.

Synopsis
The series is about a man who sold his soul to a devil ten years ago to obtain fortune and fame. As his contract is soon to expire, he tries to make a deal with the devil using his life as collateral.

Cast

Main

 Jung Kyung-ho as Ha Rip / Seo Dong-cheon, a star composer who has sold his soul to a titular devil. He has enjoyed youth and success with numerous hits to his name.
 Park Sung-woong as Mo Tae-gang / Ryu, a top actor who is possessed by the devil Ryu, to whom Ha Rip sold his soul.
 Nam Da-reum as Ryu's true form
 Lee Seol as Kim I-gyeong, an unsuccessful singer-songwriter who only knows bad luck.
 Lee El as Ji Seo-yeong, the CEO of Soul Entertainment.

Supporting
 Song Kang as Luka, Ha Rip's rookie assistant.
 Kim Ye-jun as young Luka
 Yoon Kyung-ho as Mr. Kang, Tae-gang's secretary.
 Nam Ji-hyun as Yu Dong-hui, I-gyeong's best friend.
 Oh Eui-shik as Kang Ha, Ha Rip's housemate.
 Lee Hwa-kyum as Joo Ra-in, an idol singer.
 Jung Won-young as Shi-Ho, an idol singer.
 Kim Hyung-mook as Lee Choong-ryeol, co-CEO of Soul Entertainment.
 Kim Won-hae as Kong Soo-rae, a coffeehouse owner and I-gyeong's boss.
 Im Ji-kyu as Kyung-Soo, a police officer and I-gyeong's step brother.
 Choi Yoo-song as Ye Jung-ah, Luka's mother.
 Ryu Hye-rin as Jung Hye-won
 Lee Bong-ryun as a nurse

Original soundtrack

Special Edition

Part 1

Part 2

Part 3

Part 4

Part 5

Part 6

Part 7

Part 8

Part 9

Production
When the Devil Calls Your Name reunites Jung Kyung-ho and Park Sung-woong who previously starred together in Life on Mars (2018). Lee Seol's singing voice was provided by singer Sondia.

Viewership

Awards and nominations

Notes

References

External links
  
 
 

TVN (South Korean TV channel) television dramas
Korean-language television shows
2019 South Korean television series debuts
2019 South Korean television series endings
South Korean melodrama television series
South Korean fantasy television series
Works based on Goethe's Faust